Jimmy Abraham Enabu (born 17 April 1988) is a Ugandan professional basketball player. He currently plays for the City Oilers club of the FIBA Africa Club Champions Cup and the National Basketball League (Uganda).

He started his career with the Knight Riders basketball team in Entebbe, Uganda in 2007.

He represented Uganda's national basketball team at the 2017 AfroBasket in Tunisia and Senegal, where he was Uganda’s best passer as he recorded most assists for his team.

He has won six straight National Basketball League titles with his team The City Oilers. The City Oilers have made a record for a team that has won all titles of the National Basketball League that it has competed in

References

External links
 FIBA profile
 Real GM profile
 Afrobasket.com profile

1988 births
Living people
Point guards
Ugandan men's basketball players
People from Entebbe
City Oilers players